The 2012 Toulon Tournament was the 40th edition of the Toulon Tournament and took place from 23 May to 1 June. Colombia were the defending champions, but they did not participate this year.

Mexico U-23 won their first tournament title by defeating Turkey A2 3–0 in the final. Héctor Herrera was awarded Meilleur joueur as the most outstanding player of the tournament.

Participating teams

 Turkey A2

Venues
The matches were played in these communes:
Aubagne
Avignon
Hyères
Le Lavandou
La Seyne-sur-Mer
La Valette-du-Var
Nice
Saint-Raphaël

Squads

Results
All times are local (UTC+2).

Group A

Group B

Knockout stage

All times are UTC+2

Semifinals

Third place play-off

Final

Goal scorers
7 goals
 Marco Fabián

3 goals
 Nicolas de Préville
 Rick ten Voorde

2 goals

 Valère Germain
 Terence Makengo
 Takashi Usami
 Cándido Ramírez
 Zakaria Labyad
 Nacer Barazite
 Ricky van Haaren

1 goal

 Stanislaw Drahun
 Mikhail Sivakov
 Ahmed Eid
 Omar Gaber
 Marwan Mohsen
 Salah Soliman
 Loïck Landre
 Rémi Mulumba
 Adrien Trebel
 Hiroshi Ibusuki
 Takahiro Ogihara
 Manabu Saito
 Zouhair Feddal
 Ryane Frikeche
 Yacine Qasmi
 Héctor Herrera
 Raúl Jiménez
 Hiram Mier
 Alan Pulido
 Roland Alberg
 Ninos Gouriye
 Ben Rienstra
 Giliano Wijnaldum
 Emre Güral
 Tevfik Köse
 Eren Tozlu

Own goal
 Kazuki Oiwa (playing against Turkey)
 Zouhair Feddal (playing against Mexico)

Final standings

 
  Turkey A2

External links
Toulon Tournament

 
2012
2011–12 in French football
2011–12 in Mexican football
2011–12 in Turkish football
2011–12 in Dutch football
2011–12 in Egyptian football
2011–12 in Moroccan football
2012 in Japanese football
2012 in Belarusian football
2012 in youth association football
May 2012 sports events in France
June 2012 sports events in France